Epicaeciliini is a tribe of Psocoptera from the family Caeciliusidae.

References 

Caeciliusidae
Insects described in 2000
Insect tribes